Bert Parker may refer to:

Bert Parker, character in Those We Love
Bert Parker (trainer), see List of Harrow Borough F.C. seasons

See also
Albert Parker (disambiguation)
Robert Parker (disambiguation)
Herbert Parker (disambiguation)
Hubert Parker (disambiguation)